Vida Ghahremani (12 June 1936 – 1 June 2018) was an Iranian-born American film and stage actress, writer, and educator.

Early life and education 
Vida Ghahremani was born 12 June 1936 in Tehran. She began acting in films as a teenager, under the mentorship and influence of Khan Baba Motazedi. Her earliest work was in 1955 in Crossroad of Events; followed by a 1958 film called Storm in Our Time. She was known for the first romantic kiss to be portrayed in Iranian cinema, when she played opposite to Naser Malek Motiei in Crossroad of Events (1955). She was just a teenager around 16 or 17 years old during the filming of the first kiss. and as a result she was expelled from Shahdokht High School during her final year.

After receiving her degree in Early Childhood Development, she worked at Institute for the Intellectual Development of Children and Young Adults, Tehran. She was the mother of three children.

Career 
She had lived in Canada for less than a decade, before moving to California. Ghahremani taught creative theatre and Persian language in Pleasanton, California and at the Berkeley Persian Center, where she had been an active member since its establishment in 1992.

In 2008, Ghahremani published Aroussi-e Khaaleh ("Auntie’s Wedding"), a collection of autobiographic stories. Her second book, Safar-e Kaash ("A Trip to Kaash"), published in 2010, was an autobiographical story of adventures during her early years of marriage to David Yeghiazarian.

Ghahremani received a B.A. degree in Early Childhood Education and held a diploma in Directing and Producing television. She was a member of the Screen Actors Guild (SAG), the Gem and Mineral society. In 2007, she finished a film with director Wayne Wang called A Thousand Years of Good Prayers, as supporting actress.

Her daughter is Torange Yeghiazarian, an actress and one of the founding artistic directors of Golden Thread Productions in San Francisco. Ghahremani served as an artistic associate at Golden Thread Productions. In 2015, she produced and starred in the theater work Isfahan Blues, in collaboration with Golden Thread Productions, Torange Yeghiazarian, L. Peter Callender, Nakissa Etemad, Laura Hope, and Marcus Shelby; it was inspired by the Duke Ellington Orchestra’s 1963 tour in Iran. Isfahan Blues dealt with the theme of music as a gateway to power and creativity.

Filmography

References

External links

1936 births
2018 deaths
People from Tehran
Actresses from Tehran
Iranian film actresses
American stage actresses
20th-century Iranian actresses
Actresses from Berkeley, California
Iranian emigrants to the United States
Iranian expatriates in the United States